Flight Lieutenant Harry Noel Cornforth Robinson (25 December 1898 – 2 June 1926) was a British World War I flying ace credited with 10 aerial victories. After winning the Military Cross and Croix de guerre, he remained in service post-war, winning the Distinguished Flying Cross in Iraq.

World War I
Robinson was commissioned as a temporary second lieutenant (on probation) on the General List of the Royal Flying Corps on 10 May 1917, and was confirmed in his rank and appointed a flying officer on 12 July 1917.

He was posted to No. 46 Squadron, initially flying the Sopwith Pup, until the squadron was re-equipped with the Sopwith Camel in November 1917. It would be 28 December 1917 before he scored his first aerial victory, being responsible for capturing a German reconnaissance aircraft. His second victory came on 11 March 1918, when he drove down out of control an Albatros D.V. Then, between 21 and 24 March, he scored six more victories.

On 28 March 1918 Robinson was appointed a flight commander, with the rank of acting captain, and was reassigned to No. 70 Squadron, where he gained two more victories in April and May. He was also awarded the Military Cross which was gazetted on 3 May 1918. His citation read:

Temporary Second Lieutenant Harry Noel Cornforth Robinson, General List and RFC.
"For conspicuous gallantry and devotion to duty. While on an offensive patrol he had trouble with his petrol pressure and was forced to turn back towards our lines. On his way back he saw seven enemy scouts attacking two of our artillery machines. He immediately dived on to the enemy and drove one of them down. During this operation one of his guns jammed. The enemy still continued the attack and he again dived on them, but his remaining gun also jammed. Though both his guns were out of action and he had very little petrol left, he continued to dive on the enemy repeatedly and eventually drove them away. He showed splendid courage and resource."

Post-war career
Robinson remained in the RAF after the end of the war, relinquishing his acting rank of captain on 27 March 1919. He was granted a short service commission with the rank of flying officer on 24 October 1919, and later saw active service in Iraq, where he was awarded the Distinguished Flying Cross, gazetted on 28 October 1921. His citation read:
Flying Officer Harry Noel Cornforth Robinson, MC, RAF.
"For gallantry and devotion to duty. A gallant and daring pilot, especially while operating round Samawah and Nasiriyeh. His keenness at all times has been much marked."

On 24 October 1923 Robinson was granted a permanent commission with the rank of flying officer, and was promoted to flight lieutenant on 1 January 1925.

Robinson died on 2 June 1926, with the Hartlepool Mail reporting that he had been "ill for seven months".

List of aerial victories

See also
 Aerial victory standards of World War I
 List of World War I aces credited with 10 victories
 Winged Victory

References

1898 births
1926 deaths
People from West Hartlepool
Royal Flying Corps officers
Royal Air Force officers
British World War I flying aces
Recipients of the Military Cross
Recipients of the Distinguished Flying Cross (United Kingdom)
Recipients of the Croix de Guerre 1914–1918 (France)